The Denton Formation is a geologic formation in Texas. It preserves fossils dating back to the Cretaceous period.

See also

 List of fossiliferous stratigraphic units in Texas
 Paleontology in Texas

References
 

Cretaceous geology of Texas